Marfa may refer to:

Music 
 Marfa (instrument), an African percussion instrument
 Marfa (music), celebratory music of the Hyderabadi Muslims

Places 
 Márfa, a village in Baranya county, Hungary
 Marfa, Chad
 Marfa, Texas, a city in the high desert of the Trans-Pecos in western Texas
 Marfa, Malta, a port near  in northern Malta

Other uses
Marfa (given name)
 CFR Marfă, a state-owned freight railway business of Romania
 Marfa, a sub-group of the Maba people of north-central Africa
 Marfa language, a Maban language spoken in Chad
 Marfa front, another term for a dry line
 Marfa lights, a possible paranormal phenomena frequently visible near Marfa, Texas
 , a painting by avant-garde artist Kazimir Malevich

See also
 Marwa (disambiguation)